Sochitta Sal (born October 22, 1992), professionally known by her stage name Honey Cocaine, or Honey C, is a Canadian rapper.

Early life and education
Sal is of Cambodian descent and was born in Toronto, Canada.  Currently, she splits her residence between Los Angeles and Toronto.

Career
Her debut single "I Don't Give a Fuck" was released in 2011.

In March 2012, she was grazed in the arm by a bullet while riding in a van, after she and Tyga performed at a concert in Omaha, Nebraska. She was treated and shortly released from the hospital. In late 2012, she featured on Tyga's Well Done 3 mixtape. She became known by 2012 for her feature on T-Raw's "Heisman" track.

In 2013, she signed a publishing deal with Warner/Chappell Music. Honey C also toured with Tyga in 2013 and released a few of her best-known solo singles that year and into 2014 ("Curveball," "ChiChi Get The Yayo," "Middlefinger" etc.).  In 2014 she released Like a Drug.  By 2015, Honey C had featured on tracks by artists such as Kid Ink, Dizzy Wright and Kirko Bangz.

Like a Drug
Like a Drug is her fourth mixtape, released on October 22, 2014.

Background and development
After the release of her third mixtape Thug Love, Honey Cocaine kept on appearing on other artists' songs. On January 15, 2014, the song "Blueberry Chills" featuring Chanel West Coast was released. Honey Cocaine first announced her plans to release a new mixtape in February 2014. On June 29, 2014, she released a snippet of the song "Side Chick". A snippet of the song "Gwola" was released a month later. On August 26, 2014, she announced the release date of the mixtape, scheduled on her birthday, October 22.

Singles
The first single "Curveball" was released on October 13, 2014. The accompanying music video was unveiled on the day of the release.

Like a Drug track listing

Selected discography

Mixtapes

Music videos

As lead artist

As featured artist

References

1992 births
Living people
Canadian expatriate musicians in the United States
Canadian women rappers
Canadian hip hop singers
Canadian people of Cambodian descent
Rappers from Toronto
Shooting survivors
21st-century Canadian rappers
21st-century women rappers